The first season of Australian Idol was produced by Fremantle Media subsidiary Grundy Television in association with UK company 19TV, and was broadcast on Network Ten for 19 weeks in the latter half of 2003. The judges were Mark Holden, Marcia Hines and Ian "Dicko" Dickson.

Overview
When Network Ten paid $15 million for the first season of Australian Idol they anticipated it to be a critical and financial success, like it had been in other countries such as the UK and the USA. When the show aired for the first time in August 2003 it was very successful, attracting a diverse ranges of viewers, from people wanting the crazy auditions to people who wanted to hear great voices. The audition process went through several major cities in Australia including Sydney, Melbourne, Perth, Adelaide and Darwin. Towards the end of its run, Australian Idol became the most popular TV show in the country with more ratings than major events such as the AFL Grand Final. The Grand Final at the Sydney Opera House attracted more than 3 million viewers.

The winner of the competition was Guy Sebastian. He beat Shannon Noll who finished in 2nd place, Cosima De Vito who came in 3rd place, Paulini Curuenavuli who came in 4th place & Rob Mills who finished in 5th place. After Idol, it was these five, the Final 5, who were the most successful out of the Top 12.

Other Idol contestants from Season 1 to release music were Rebekah LaVauney, Peter Ryan and Courtney Act.

In the third semi final, just before the live verdict, one of the contestants, Anthony Sumbati, was disqualified for taking part in a radio interview without the consent of the producers. He later performed in the Grand Final as one of the performances outside the Sydney Opera House.

In the wildcard show, a contestant named Daniel Wakefield was originally meant to be in the top 12, but due to his contract, he wasn't able to be in the top 12. Instead of having one contestant chosen by the judges and the other chosen by Australia, three contestants were chosen, two by Australia and one by the judges.

Semi-finals

Group 1

 Chelsea Gibson – "Beautiful"  (Christina Aguilera)
 Shannon Thompson – "Lately"  (Stevie Wonder)
 Natalie Ferguson – "Son of a Preacher Man"  (Dusty Springfield)
 Lorena Alegria – "To Zion"  (Lauryn Hill)

 Daniel Wakefield – "You'll Never Walk Alone"  (Gerry & the Pacemakers)
 Veronica Stewart – "I Want to Know What Love Is"  (Foreigner)
 Peter Ryan – "Right Here Waiting" (Richard Marx)
 Eli Diache – "Angel"   (Sarah McLachlan)

Advancing to the Top 12: Daniel Wakefield and Peter Ryan
Wildcard Contenders: Eli Diache

Group 2

 Cosima De Vito – "My Heart Will Go On"  (Celine Dion)
 Marc Stockley – "Let it Be"  (The Beatles)
 Hailey Cramer – "Run to You"  (Whitney Houston)
 Sidney Maynard – "Ribbon in the Sky"  (Stevie Wonder)

 Rebecca Tapia – "Shadowland" (from The Lion King)
 Axle Whitehead – "Pastime Paradise"  (Stevie Wonder)
 Kelly Cavuoto – "Bring Me to Life" (Evanescence)
 Mathew Chadwick – "Truly"  (Lionel Richie)

Advancing to the Top 12: Mathew Chadwick and Kelly Cavuoto
Wildcard Contenders: Cosima De Vito, Rebecca Tapia and Axle Whitehead

Group 3

 Jennifer Pearl – "The Day You Went Away"  (Wendy Matthews)
 Ryan Sheppard – "Swear It Again"  (Westlife)
 Martine Robert – "The First Time Ever I Saw Your Face"  (Roberta Flack)
 Anthony Sumbati – "The More I See You"  (Michael Bublé)

 Rebekah LaVauney – "Ex-Factor" (Lauryn Hill)
 Shannon Noll – "Better Man"  (Robbie Williams)
 Yolande Jackson – "Winter"  (Tori Amos)
 Guy Sebastian – "What a Wonderful World"  (Louis Armstrong)

Advancing to the Top 12: Guy Sebastian and Shannon Noll
Wildcard Contenders: Rebekah LaVauney and Yolande Jackson

Group 4

 Mary Lane – "Holding Out for a Hero"  (Bonnie Tyler)
 Michelle Cashman – "My Heart Will Go On"  (Celine Dion)
 Costa Zacharia – "Whenever You Call"  (Mariah Carey)
 Brielle Davis – "Even God Must Get the Blues"  (Jo Dee Messina)

 Levi Kereama – "Nice and Slow"  (Usher)
 Cle Wootton – "Come to Me" (Diesel)
 Brandon Burns – "Better Man"  (Robbie Williams)
 Lauren Buckley – "Imagine" (John Lennon)

Advancing to the Top 12: Cle Wootton and Lauren Buckley
Wildcard Contenders: Levi Kereama

Group 5

 Marcus Jones – "Burn for You"  (John Farnham)
 Ben Manusama – "Hard to Say I'm Sorry"  (Chicago)
 Alex Longstaff – "Even When I'm Sleeping" (Leonardo's Bride)
 Anton Aktila – "End of the Road"  (Boyz II Men)

 Rhett Butler – "Smack That"  (Akon)
 Paulini Curuenavuli – "Somewhere" (Barbra Streisand)
 Courtney Act – "You Don't Own Me"  (Lesley Gore)
 Rob Mills – "Angels"  (Robbie Williams)

Advancing to the Top 12:  Paulini Curuenavuli and Rob Mills
Wildcard Contenders: Stu Campbell and Courtney Act

Wildcards

 Eli Diache – "Permission to Shine"  (Bachelor Girl)
 Stu Campbell – "Whisper Your Name"  (Harry Connick, Jr.)
 Yolande Jackson – "Stuck"  (Stacie Orrico)
 Liban Aden – "Where I Wanna Be"  (Donell Jones)
 Rebekah LaVauney – "Exhale (Shoop Shoop)" (Whitney Houston)

 Courtney Act – "You Shook Me All Night Long"  (AC/DC)
 Axle Whitehead – "Yesterday"  (The Beatles)
 Cosima De Vito – "Predictable"  (Delta Goodrem)
 Levi Kereama – "Maria Maria"  (Santana)
 Rebecca Tapia – "Let's Get Loud"  (Jennifer Lopez)

Advancing to the Top 12: Rebekah LaVauney, Levi Kereama and Cosima De Vito

Weekly Song Themes

Top 12 – The 70s

Top 10 – Australian #1s

Top 8 – Australian Made

The Top 12 Contestants

Guy Sebastian

Guy Sebastian was the winner of the first series of Australian Idol.

Sebastian's performances on Australian Idol:

Audition: "Ribbon in the Sky"  (Stevie Wonder)
Theatre Week (Round 1): "Back at One"  (Brian McKnight)
Theatre Week (Round 3): "Somewhere Over the Rainbow"  (Judy Garland)
Top 40: "What a Wonderful World"  (Louis Armstrong)
Top 12: "The Love You Save"  (Jackson Five)
Top 10: "(Everything I Do) I Do It for You"  (Bryan Adams)
Top 8: "You're the Voice"  (John Farnham)
Top 6: "When Doves Cry"  (Prince)
Up, Close & Personal: "When I Get You Alone"  (Robin Thicke)
Top 5: "Hidden Agenda"  (Craig David), "Hello"  (Lionel Richie)
Top 4: "The Way You Look Tonight"  (Jerome Kern & Dorothy Fields), Hit the Road Jack"  (Percy Mayfield)
Top 3: "Can't Take My Eyes off You"  (Frankie Valli), "Climb Every Mountain"  (Julie Andrews, from The Sound of Music) TOUCHDOWN
Top 2: "I'll Be There" (The Jackson 5), "Crazy in Love" (Beyoncé Knowles), "Angels Brought Me Here"  (winner's single)

Shannon Noll

Shannon Noll (born 16 September 1975), was runner-up to winner Guy Sebastian.

Audition: "Hold Me in Your Arms"  (Southern Sons)
Theatre Week (Round 1): "Hold Me in Your Arms"  (Southern Sons)
Theatre Week (Round 3): "Burn for You"  (John Farnham)
Top 40: "Better Man"  (Robbie Williams)
Top 12: "Help Is on Its Way"  (Little River Band)
Top 10: "What About Me"  (Moving Pictures)
Top 8: "Already Gone"  (Powderfinger)
Top 6: "Livin' on a Prayer"  (Bon Jovi) Bottom 3
Up, Close & Personal: "With or Without You"  (U2)
Top 5: "Higher and Higher"  (Jackie Wilson), "When a Man Loves a Woman"  (Percy Sledge)
Top 4: "I've Got You Under My Skin",  "New York, New York (Frank Sinatra)
Top 3: "One"  (Harry Nilsson), "Hey Jude"  (The Beatles)
Top 2: "Please Forgive Me"  (Bryan Adams), "Working Class Man"  (Jimmy Barnes), "Angels Brought Me Here"  (winner's single)

Cosima De Vito

Cosima De Vito (born 1 November 1976), came third in Australian Idol after withdrawing because of a sudden diagnosis of throat nodules.

Audition: "I Surrender"  (Celine Dion)
Theatre Week (Round 1):
Theatre Week (Round 3): "Call the Man"  (Celine Dion)
Top 40: "My Heart Will Go On"  (Celine Dion)
Wildcard Show: "Predictable"  (Delta Goodrem)
Top 12: "Hot Stuff"  (Donna Summer)
Top 10: "I Wanna Dance With Somebody"  (Whitney Houston)
Top 8: "When the War Is Over"  (Cold Chisel) ~ TOUCHDOWN!
Top 6: "What's Love Got To Do With It"  (Tina Turner)
Up, Close & Personal: "Hero"  (Mariah Carey)
Top 5: "I Believe I Can Fly"  (R. Kelly), "Respect"  (Aretha Franklin) ~ TOUCHDOWN!  Bottom 2
Top 4: "L-O-V-E"  (Nat King Cole), "Smile" (Charlie Chaplin)
Top 3: "You Don't Have to Say You Love Me"  (Dusty Springfield),  "River Deep - Mountain High"  (Tina Turner) Withdrawn

After recovering Cosima signed with an independent label and became the first independent artist to debut at #1 on the charts. Her debut single was the cover of Cold Chisel's "When the War Is Over". Cosima later released several singles and a gold selling self-titled album.

Paulini Curuenavuli

Paulini Curuenavuli (born 15 October 1982), was eliminated on 27 October 2003, placed fourth.

Audition: "Ain't No Mountain High Enough"   (Marvin Gaye & Tammi Terrell)
Theatre Week (Round 1):
Theatre Week (Round 3): "Go to Hell"  (Nina Simone)
Top 40: "Somewhere" (Barbra Streisand)
Top 12: "Don't Leave Me This Way" (Thelma Houston)
Top 10: "Eternal Flame" (The Bangles)
Top 8: "Chains" (Tina Arena)
Top 6: "Freeway of Love"  (Aretha Franklin) ~ TOUCHDOWN! Bottom 2
Up, Close & Personal: "Fields of Gold" (Sting)
Top 5: "Un-Break My Heart" (Toni Braxton) & "Survivor" (Destiny's Child)
Top 4: "At Last" (Etta James) & "Almost Like Being in Love" (Natalie Cole) Eliminated

Paulini performed "Freeway of Love", "The Voice Within", "Crazy in Love" and "Chains" during the Australian Idol national tour in 2004.

Rob Mills

Rob Mills aka Millsy (born 21 June 1982), was eliminated on 20 October 2003, placed fifth.

Audition: "Swear It Again" (Westlife)
Theatre Week (Round 1): "Swear It Again" (Westlife)
Theatre Week (Round 3):
Top 40: "Angels" (Robbie Williams)
Top 12: "All Right Now" (Free)
Top 10: "You Don't Treat Me No Good" (Sonia Dada)
Top 8:  "Take Me Back" (Noiseworks)
Top 6:  "If I Could"  (1927)
Up, Close and Personal:  "When You Say Nothing at All" (Ronan Keating)
Top 5:  "Too Close" (Next) and "If I Could Turn Back the Hands of Time" (R. Kelly) Eliminated

Levi Kereama
Levi Kereama (Born 1981-4 October 2008) was eliminated on 13 October 2003, placed sixth.

Audition:
Theatre Week (Round 1):
Theatre Week (Round 3):
Top 40: "Nice and Slow"  (Usher)
Wildcard Show: "Maria Maria"  (Santana)
Top 12: "Superstition"  (Stevie Wonder)
Top 10: "Rock Your Body"  (Justin Timberlake)
Top 8:  "To the Moon and Back"  (Savage Garden) Bottom 3
Top 6:  "Every Little Step"  (Bobby Brown) Eliminated

A record contract followed and he got into his band Lethbridge with his three brothers. On 4 October 2008, Levi died after falling from the balcony of the Brisbane hotel where he had been staying.

Rebekah LaVauney
Rebekah LaVauney (born 7 October 1977), was eliminated on 6 October 2003, placed seventh.

Audition:
Theatre Week (Round 1): "Joyful, Joyful"  (Lauryn Hill)
Theatre Week (Round 3): "Love Takes Time"  (Mariah Carey)
Top 40: "Ex-Factor" (Lauryn Hill)
Wildcard Show: "Exhale (Shoop Shoop)" (Whitney Houston)
Top 12: "Emotion" (Samantha Sang)
Top 10: "Killing Me Softly with His Song" (The Fugees)
Top 8: "Heading in the Right Direction" (Renee Geyer) Eliminated

She released a single cover of Renée Geyer's "Heading in the Right Direction" (which she had previously performed on the show) which was featured on her only commercial release, an EP titled 'Chapter 1' (2005). The EP also featured a collaboration with Joel Turner and the Modern-Day Poets, "Behind Bars", which was also included on their self-titled album.

Kelly Cavuoto
Kelly Cavuoto (born 3 June 1981), was eliminated on 6 October 2003, placed eighth.  Prior to Australian Idol, she had many years singing experience with rock bands throughout South Australia, before auditioning in 2004. Dubbed "The Rock Chick" by judge Ian "Dicko" Dickson, she covered a selection of harder edged rock songs throughout the series, at odds with most other contestants who chose to cover pop songs.

Audition: "Just A Girl"  (No Doubt)
Theatre Week (Round 1): "Chase The Dragon"  (Machine Gun Fellatio)
Theatre Week (Round 3): "You Oughta Know"  (Alanis Morissette)
Top 40: "Bring Me to Life" (Evanescence)
Top 12: "Whole Lotta Love"  (Led Zeppelin) Bottom 3
Top 10: "Tomorrow"  (Silverchair) Bottom 3
Top 8: "Mascara"  (Killing Heidi) Eliminated

In January 2004, Cavuoto appeared as a co-host for Channel Ten's Video Hits music program.

Lauren Buckley
Lauren Buckley (born 29 March 1986), was eliminated on 29 September 2003, placed ninth. At only seventeen at the time, she was the youngest finalist of the first season. Also memorable was her elimination from the show, in which she broke down and cried while singing her farewell song. She completed the song with the assistance of her fellow Idol contestants.

Audition: "Cry Me a River" (Ella Fitzgerald)
Theatre Week (Round 1):
Theatre Week (Round 3): "Turn Me On" (Norah Jones)
Top 40: "Imagine" (John Lennon)
Top 12: "Moondance" (Van Morrison)
Top 10: "Lady Marmalade" (Pink, Christina Aguilera, Mýa & Lil' Kim). Originally (Labelle) Eliminated

Cle Wootton
Cle Wootton (born Cleonie Morgan-Wootton on 15 November 1981), was eliminated on 29 September 2004, placed tenth. Of English and Jamaican descent, she was an early favourite with the judges, however failed to maintain an interest from fans. She has also appeared in the children's drama program Ship to Shore in 1993 playing the character Babe and appeared on the reality television program Popstars in 2002.

Audition: "Pussy Town" (Machine Gun Fellatio)
Theatre Week (Round 1):
Theatre Week (Round 3): "Ain't Nobody Better"  (Inner City)
Top 40: "Come to Me" (Diesel)
Top 12: "Young Hearts Run Free" (Candi Staton)
Top 10: "That's the Way Love Goes" (Janet Jackson) Eliminated

In 2004, she appeared in a musical production called Gabba Gabba Hey, a rock musical featuring the music of the Ramones. In 2005, she appeared on an episode of the children's television series Streetsmartz. In 2017, she was performing as Mrs Phelps in the Australian edition of Matilda the Musical.

Peter Ryan
Peter Ryan, from New South Wales, was eliminated on 22 September 2004, placed eleventh.

Audition: "Comic Conversation" (John Farnham)
Theatre Week (Round 1):
Theatre Week (Round 3): "Now and Forever"  (Richard Marx)
Top 40: "Right Here Waiting" (Richard Marx)
Top 12: "Your Song"  (Elton John) Eliminated

Mathew Chadwick
Mathew Chadwick (born 19 July 1983), was eliminated on 22 September 2004, placed twelfth.

Audition: "I Want To Make Magic"  (Fame)
Theatre Week (Round 1): "Tiny Dancer"  (Elton John)
Theatre Week (Round 3): "Two Beds and a Coffee Machine"  (Savage Garden)
Top 40: "Truly"  (Lionel Richie)
Top 12: "If"  (Bread) Eliminated

As of 2007, he was under the management of Richard Macionis, and performing in Queensland's Dracula's Cabaret Restaurant along with Macionis. Prior to Australian Idol he had played Fred as part of the Scooby Doo section of Warner Brothers Movie World in his home state of Queensland.

Finals elimination chart

Elimination chart

Commercial Releases
Since winning Australian Idol, Guy Sebastian has released ten top 10 albums, with eight reaching the top 5, including three #1's. Sebastian has also released 23 top 20 singles, with 14 reaching the top 10, including six #1's. He has the most #1 singles for an Australian male vocalist in Australian music history, and he is third overall for all Australian acts. He has a total of 69 platinum and seven gold certifications in Australia, the highest accreditations for any Australian Idol contestant. Sebastian's debut album Just As I Am reached #1 and 6× platinum, eventually selling 480,000 copies. Just As I Am remains the highest selling album ever released by an Australian Idol contestant.  Guy Sebastian's winner's single "Angels Brought Me Here" debuted at #1 and reached 5× platinum. The song was the highest selling single in Australia in 2003, and won the 2004 Highest Selling Single ARIA Award.  In 2010 ARIA announced it was the highest selling song of the previous decade. Sebastian's second and third albums were platinum sellers. Beautiful Life peaked at #2, with Closer to the Sun reaching #4 His fourth album The Memphis Album peaked at #3 and went on to sell 2× platinum. Sebastian's 5th  album Like It Like That achieved platinum certification. His next two albums, Twenty Ten and Armageddon, gained double platinum certification. Armageddon was his second album to achieve #1. Sebastian's eighth album Madness has been certified gold. "Like it Like That", the 4× platinum title track from his fifth album, reached #1 and was the highest selling Australian artist song of 2009.

"Who's That Girl" the only single released from Twenty Ten also reached #1 and was certified 5× platinum. It was nominated for the 2011 ARIA Best Pop Release and Song of the Year, and won the Highest Selling Single ARIA. "Don't Worry Be Happy", Armageddon'''s lead single, reached #5 and gained 5× platinum certification. The third single, "Battle Scars" featuring Lupe Fiasco, became his sixth #1 single in Australia, and has been certified 12× platinum. Sebastian's most recent album, T.R.U.T.H., became his third to reach #1, and has been certified gold. During his career Sebastian has received 34 ARIA Award nominations, winning seven of them including Best Pop Release and Best Live Act.ARIA Nominations. Australian Recording Industry Association. 28 September 2010. Archived from the original on 21 January 2012.Winners of the 2011 ARIA Awards.Sydney Morning Herald. 27 November 2011. Archived from the original on 30 November 2012.Smith, Sarah (6 October 2014). Chet Faker and Violent Soho lead 2014 ARIA nominations. Faster Louder. Archived from the original on 7 October 2014.Here are all the winners from the 2019 ARIA Awards.The Music Network. 27 November 2019. Retrieved 28 November 2019.

Sebastian also had success outside of Australia with his first single reaching #1 in Malaysia, Singapore, the Philippines and Indonesia and New Zealand in 2004. His first album reached #3 in New Zealand.Beautiful Life & Guy Facts. opensubscriber.com. Archived from the original on 19 January 2012. "Angels Brought Me Here" gained platinum and Just As I Am double platinum accreditation in New Zealand. Sebastian has achieved five further top ten singles in New Zealand since then, including another #1 with "Who's That Girl", and now has a total of six platinum and three gold certifications there.Official New Zealand Music Charts – 26 November 2012.Recording Industry Association New Zealand (RIANZ). Archived from the original on 25 November 2012. Sebastian is currently the only Australian Idol contestant to chart in the US. "Battle Scars" reached #71 on the Billboard Hot 100, #23 on the Billboard Digital Songs Chart and #1 on the Billboard R&B/Hip-hop Digital Song Chart.R&B/Hip-hop Digital Song Chart 15 September 2012 Billboard.biz. Archived from the original on 13 September 2012. It spent 20 weeks in the Hot 100 and was certified platinum in the US for sales of one million.Adams, Cameron (6 August 2013).Guy Sebastian's Battle Scars tops one million US sales news.com.au. Retrieved 7 August 2013 "Battle Scars" also reached #2 in Norway. In 2015 Sebastian was selected to represent Australia in the Eurovision Song Contest. He finished 5th, and his song "Tonight Again" charted in the top 50 in a number of European countries, including No.6 in Iceland and 16 in Austria.Guy Sebastian – Tonight Again, Chartlist week 21, 2015. Tonlist. Archived from the original on 1 June 2015.

Shannon Noll released his first single "What About Me?" in February 2004. It debuted at #1 and remained at the top for four weeks. It was certified 4× Platinum and was the highest selling single in Australia in 2004. His debut album That's What I'm Talking About was also a chart topper gaining 5× Platinum accreditation selling 350,000 copies. Both the single and album were nominated as highest seller at the 2004 ARIA Awards. His second album Lift also reached #1 on the ARIA charts and remained in the top 50 for 53 weeks. It was accredited 3× platinum with 210,000 copies sold. Lift received a nomination for best pop release at the 2006 ARIA Awards and the lead single "Shine" was nominated for highest selling single. "Don't Give Up" a duet with Natalie Bassingthwaighte was also nominated for highest selling single at the 2007 ARIA Awards. His third album, Turn It Up, was released in 2007 peaking at #3 and reaching platinum accreditation.aria.com.au ARIA Charts – Accreditations – 2007 Albums Retrieved 13 October 2009 His fourth album No Turning Back: The Story So Far, released in 2008 peaked at #7, and his fifth album "A Million Suns" released in 2011 reached #8. Neither of these albums reached certification. Noll has released ten top 10 singles including three #1's. He is the only artist in Australian music history to achieve ten consecutive top 10 singles. He has released seven more singles since achieving this, with two reaching the ARIA Top 50, the highest one peaking at #26. He has gained 17 platinum and three gold accreditations during his career. Noll has had some success outside Australia with his debut single What About Me reaching #2 in Ireland and #10 in New Zealand. His debut album also peaked at #31 on the New Zealand charts.

Cosima De Vito released "When the War Is Over" as her debut single in mid-2004 through her own independent label, CDV Records. It was a #1 hit and sold over 70,000 copies resulting in platinum status. Her debut self-titled album Cosima peaked at #2 on the charts and reached gold certification. Her second single "Now That You Can't Have Me" peaked at #42 on the charts. Her second album This Is Now that was released in September 2007 didn't chart in the ARIA Charts.

Paulini Curuenavuli released a debut single titled "Angel Eyes" which reached #1 and platinum certification. It stayed at the top spot for four weeks. Her debut album One Determined Heart also reached #1 and received platinum status. Her Christmas EP "Amazing Grace: Songs for Christmas" peaked at #72. Her second album Superwoman reached #70. The album gave her two top 50 singles. In 2006 Paulini joined an all girl pop group called the "Young Divas" with other former Idol contestants including Kate DeAraugo, Emily Williams, Ricki-Lee Coulter and later Jessica Mauboy. They achieved success with a double platinum album and platinum and gold singles.

Courtney Act has become a successful drag queen performer based in Los Angeles. In December 2013, Logo announced that Courtney Act was among 14 drag queens who would be competing on the sixth season of RuPaul's Drag Race. She later went on to become a finalist in the competition, alongside fellow contestants Adore Delano and Bianca Del Rio, but in the season finale lost the title to Bianca Del Rio. In July 2014, Courtney Act became the first drag performer in history to sing live with the San Francisco Symphony Orchestra. Act appeared as a guest performer with Cheyenne Jackson in "Hello, Gorgeous! Cheyenne Jackson Goes to the Movies". The two sang a duet of "Elephant Love Song" from the 2001 Baz Luhrmann film Moulin Rouge. In September 2014, Courtney Act, along with Willam Belli and Alaska Thunderfuck 5000, were the first drag queens to become ad girls for American Apparel. They worked for the campaign Support Artists, Support Ethical Manufacturing of the fashion brand, featuring three limited exclusive T-shirts that honors each drag queen's talents and allure. Courtney also has a Wig Company called Wigs By Vanity that she set up in 2003 for drag queens with a business partner and fellow drag queen, Vanity Faire. In December 2015, Courtney was featured on two singles from the Christmas Queens LP, "From Head To Mistletoe", and "Christmas Sweater" with fellow American Apparel ad girls Willam and Alaska. As of 2016, Act has been a foreign correspondent for the Australian news website, Junkee. Act covered the Presidential election of 2016 for the site, attending rallies of both Hillary Clinton and Donald Trump. Following Trump's election, Act also participated in and reported on the 2017 Women's March.

Rob Mills experienced a very short lived career at Sony BMG with one gold selling single "Ms. Vanity" and an album titled Up All Night which peaked at #21.  He was later dropped from the label.  He appeared in the Australian 2008 production of Wicked'', and has also worked in television.

References

External links 
 Official Australian Idol website
Australian Idol 2023 website

Australian Idol
2003 Australian television seasons